Dina Koston (b. 1929?, d. 2009, Washington, D.C.) was an American pianist, music educator and composer.

Life and career
Dina Koston began the study of music at age two with her mother. She continued her studies at the American Conservatory of Music and later studied with Gavin Williamson in harpsichord, Mieczyslaw Horszowski and Leon Fleisher in piano, and with Luciano Berio and Nadia Boulanger. She spent one summer studying at Darmstadt.

Koston taught at the Peabody Conservatory and at Tanglewood. She wrote music for theatrical productions at Café La Mama and the Arena Stage. With Leon Fleisher she co-founded and co-directed the Theater Chamber Players from 1968-2003, which was the first resident chamber ensemble of the Smithsonian Institution and of The Kennedy Center.

Koston married Dr. Roger L. Shapiro (1927-2002), a research psychiatrist and psychoanalyst. She suffered from a long illness at the end of her life and died in Washington, D.C. A bequest after her death established the Dina Koston and Roger Shapiro Fund for New Music. This fund provides for commissions and performance of new music at the Library of Congress in Washington, D.C.

Works
Koston composed for a variety of instruments. Selected works include:

In Memory of Jeannette Walters
Trio Brasso
Flourishes
Reflections
Messages
Solo for clarinet
Wordplay
Distant Intervals

Her work is recorded and available on media including:
Leon Fleisher: All the Things You Are (2014)

References

External links
"For Solo Violin" by Dina Koston from YouTube.

1920s births
2009 deaths
20th-century classical composers
American music educators
American women music educators
American women classical composers
American classical composers
American classical pianists
American women classical pianists
American Conservatory of Music alumni
Tanglewood Music Center faculty
20th-century classical pianists
20th-century American pianists
20th-century American women pianists
20th-century American composers
20th-century women composers
21st-century American women